
An unditching beam is a device that is used to aid in the recovery of armoured fighting vehicles when they become bogged or "ditched". The device is a beam that is attached to the continuous tracks that provides additional traction for the vehicle to extricate itself from a ditch or from boggy conditions.

The unditching beam was first introduced into service during the First World War with the British Mark IV tank. When not in use it was stowed on two rails mounted on the roof of the tank that ran the entire length of the vehicle, and when employed the beam was chained to the tank's tracks, giving the vehicle something firm to drive over.

Unditching beams remain a commonly carried standard ancillary on a number of Russian produced armoured fighting vehicles.

See also
 Unditching roller

References

Citations

Bibliography
 
 
 
 

Automotive_engineering
World War I military equipment of the United Kingdom